The Ministry of Social Protection was a national executive ministry of the Government of Colombia responsible for coordinating and implementing the national policy and social services relating to employment, labour, health and social security; it operated from 2002 to 2012.

Created as part of a larger ministerial reform aimed at reducing the national operating budget, it consolidated the Ministry of Labour and Social Security and the Ministry of Health. It was eventually divided again into the Ministry of Labour and the Ministry of Health and Social Protection.

References

 
Colombia, Social Protection
Colombia, Social Protection
Healthcare in Colombia
Colombia, Social Protection
Colombia, Social Protection
Colombia, Social Protection
2002 establishments in Colombia